The 2012 Bahrain 1st GP2 Series round was the second round of the 2012 GP2 Series. It was held on 21 and 22 April 2012 at Bahrain International Circuit, Bahrain. The race supported the 2012 Bahrain Grand Prix. The second round was held one week later as an independent round of the championship, the only one of its kind on the 2012 calendar.

The rounds were the first time the GP2 Series has visited the Bahrain International Circuit since 2007. The circuit was a regular fixture on the calendar of the now-defunct GP2 Asia Series from its inception in 2008 until 2011, when the race was cancelled due to anti-government protests. With the GP2 Asia series being discontinued at the end of the 2011 season and merged into its parent series, the Bahrain International Circuit returned to the larger GP2 Series as part of the series' expansion to include fly-away rounds.

In the week before the first race, Barwa Addax driver Josef Král was replaced by Dani Clos. Brendon Hartley also replaced Ocean Racing Technology's Jon Lancaster.

DAMS driver Davide Valsecchi qualified on pole for the first feature race, and won both the feature and sprint races.

The first race was also the first time that the series introduced the points system used by Formula One since 2010 for the feature race, with points awarded to the top ten drivers and twenty-five points awarded to the race winner. The points for the sprint race were changed too, with the winner receiving fifteen points and the top eight drivers scoring points. The points for pole and fastest lap were doubled as well.

Classification

Qualifying

Notes:
 — Marcus Ericsson was given a ten-place grid penalty for causing an avoidable accident with Davide Valsecchi at Sepang.
 — Brendon Hartley received a five-place grid penalty for causing a collision with Giedo van der Garde during the qualifying session.

Feature Race

Notes:
 — Dani Clos, Nigel Melker and Nathanaël Berthon were classified as having finished the race, as they had completed 90% of the winners race distance.

Sprint race

Notes:
 — Felipe Nasr was given a five-place grid penalty for causing an avoidable collision with Johnny Cecotto Jr. in the feature race. He later started from the pit lane.
 — Rodolfo González received a post-race 20-second penalty.
 — Johnny Cecotto Jr. and Stefano Coletti were both classified as having finished the race, as they had completed 90% of the winners race distance.
 — Tom Dillmann started from the pit lane.

Standings after the round

Drivers' Championship standings

Teams' Championship standings

 Note: Only the top five positions are included for both sets of standings.

References

External links
GP2 Series official website – Results

Bahrain
GP2